The Gökyay Association Chess Museum is located in Altındağ, Ankara, Turkey, and displayed in a historical home.  The museum has the largest chess set collection in the world with 707 chess sets collected from 110 countries exhibited under four main themes in a 1,008 square metre area.  There is a variety of chess sets representing various cultures and made with materials including wood, metal, fishbone, marble, soapstone, felt, polyester, metal, marble, sheet metal and cast iron.

See also

References

External links
 Gökyay Association Chess Museum - Homepage

Altındağ, Ankara
Chess museums
Museums in Altındağ, Ankara
Chess in Turkey